Mailen Auroux (born 25 July 1988) is a retired tennis player from Argentina.

Auroux enjoyed success at the ITF Women's Circuit, winning 12 singles and 22 doubles titles, and made her debut for Argentina Fed Cup team in the 2010 Fed Cup World Group II, scoring a doubles win against Estonia. On 22 October 2012, she reached her career-high singles ranking of world No. 346. On 24 September 2012, she peaked at No. 125 in the doubles rankings.

ITF finals

Singles: 20 (12–8)

Doubles: 40 (22–18)

Fed Cup doubles performances

References

External links
 
 
 
 

1988 births
Argentine female tennis players
Living people
Tennis players from Buenos Aires
Tennis players at the 2011 Pan American Games
Pan American Games competitors for Argentina
21st-century Argentine women